The Sikorsky S-30 was a proposed aircraft design by Igor Sikorsky to be built by the Sikorsky Manufacturing Corporation at Roosevelt, New York in 1925. The twin engine biplane was to have been used on mail routes or configured as a commercial passenger airliner. No examples of the S-30 were ever manufactured.

Specifications

References

S-30
Biplanes
Twin piston-engined tractor aircraft